The Caves of Meghalaya comprise a large number of caves in the Jaintia, Khasi Hills, and Garo Hills districts in the Indian state of Meghalaya, and are amongst the longest caves in the world. Of the ten longest and deepest caves in India, the first nine are in Meghalaya, while the tenth is in Mizoram. The word "Krem" means cave in the local Khasi language.

The exploration of the Caves of Meghalaya is currently undertaken for both scientific and recreational pursuits,) and there are still many unexplored and partially explored caves in the state. The annual caving expeditions organized by Meghalaya Adventurers Association (MAA) are known as the "Caving in the Abode of the Clouds Project". Because they are located primarily in limestone formations, the caves continue to come under threat from the limestone mining industry.

History

According to the Bengal gazette, Krem Mawmluh was the first cave to be explored by a British subject, Lt. Yule, in 1844. Siju Cave in Garo Hills was studied in 1922 when  was explored and four species of cave life forms were identified. After the British Raj period extensive interest has been generated in caving as an adventure sport in the state. Since the 1990s, an exclusive organization known as the Meghalaya Adventurers Association (MAA) (located in Shillong) has been carrying out annual explorations in association with European speleologists, cavers from India, experts from other regions of the world, the Indian Army and the Indian Navy, bringing to light a large number and length of caves in Meghalaya, relative to other known karst regions of the country.

Numbers and size of caves

As of March 2015, 1,580 caves and cave locations have been identified in Meghalaya, of which 980 caves have been fully or partially explored, for a total length of  caves explored. Krem Liat Prah contains a huge passage called the "Aircraft Hangar." Since the MAA was established in 1994, the explored caves account for only about 5% of the total underground passages in the state of Meghalaya.

Conservation
Limestone mining for the cement industry is a major threat to the Caves of Meghalaya, causing a major collapse of the Krem Mawmluh cave, the seventh longest cave in the state of Meghalaya. The "cave-in" stimulated public awareness of the potential threat mining places to the rich scientific, tourism and ecological heritage. Ecologists and speleologists pressured the Government of Meghalaya to take effective steps to stop limestone mining in the vicinity of the limestone caves in the state. During the mid-1990s, a cement plant was planned close to the Siju Cave (called the Bat Cave), near Balphakram National Park in the Garo Hills. This project generated strong opposition from the local community, supported by international scientists, as the cave hosts many rare species of bats. After considerable public pressure was applied, the Ministry of Environment and Forests finally withheld clearance for the project.

List of twenty longest caves in Meghalaya

IUGS geological heritage site
In respect of the Krem Mawmluh Cave site being the 'GSSP of the youngest unit of the geologic time scale associated with dramatic climate changes with implications on human civilisation' the International Union of Geological Sciences (IUGS)' included the 'GSSP of the Meghalayan Stage in the Mawmluh Cave' in its assemblage of 100 'geological heritage sites' around the world in a listing published in October 2022. The organisation defines an 'IUGS Geological Heritage Site' as 'a key place with geological elements and/or processes of international scientific relevance, used as a reference, and/or with a substantial contribution to the development of geological sciences through history.'

See also 
 Cave research in India

References

Bibliography

 
Meghalaya-related lists
Meghalaya